Pellegrino Tibaldi (Valsolda, 1527–Milan, 1596), also known as Pellegrino di Tibaldo de Pellegrini, was an Italian mannerist architect, sculptor, and mural painter.

Biography
Tibaldi was born in Puria di Valsolda, then part of the duchy of Milan, but grew up in Bologna. His father worked as stonemason. He may have apprenticed with Bagnacavallo or Innocenzo da Imola. His first documented painting was likely as at 15 years of age, a Marriage of Saint Catherine.

In 1547, he went to Rome to study under Perin del Vaga.  He was employed in the decoration of the Sala del Consiglio of Castel Sant'Angelo.  When Perino died in 1547, Tibaldi became the leader in the large-scale fresco painting of the chambers and doorways (1547–1549).  The frescoes are described as Michelangelesque in influence.

Other works were for Cardinal Giovanni Poggi in Bologna, and he carried out numerous commissions for him. Tibaldi painted frescoes of the Story of Ulysses in the Palazzo Poggi, scenes from the life of the Baptist in the Poggi chapel, and scenes from the Life of Moses in the Palazzo Sacchetti in Rome.  He constructed a chapel for his patron, in the church of S. Giacomo Maggiore, and painted for it a St. John preaching in the Wilderness, and the Division of the Elect from the Damned. The Cardinal Poggi next employed him in the erection of a chapel in the Basilica della Santa Casa, Loreto, where he painted the Nativity, the Presentation in the Temple, the Transfiguration and Decollation of St. John.

He lived in Ancona between 1558 and 1561. Here he painted frescoes for Loggia dei Mercanti and Palazzo Ferretti. In 1561, he met Cardinal Carlo Borromeo, who employed him in Milan mostly as architect in the nearly endless task of constructing the cathedral, working on various projects in the cathedral, the courtyard of the archiepiscopal palace (1564–70), San Fedele (1569–1579) and San Sebastiano (1577). In Milan he worked also as a civil architect, projecting the Spinola, Erba Odescalchi and Prospero Visconti palaces. In 1575 he was commissioned by Cardinal Tolomeo Gallio the construction of Villa d'Este on the shores of Lake Como. In Pavia, again for Cardinal Charles Borromeo, Tibaldi designed the monumental building of the Almo Collegio Borromeo: a university boarding school set on an airy courtyard with a perfect quadrature, characterized by the elegant Serlian architectural design of the two orders of loggias. Also in Pavia, commissioned by Pope Pius V, Tibaldi was entrusted with the construction of the Collegio Ghislieri in 1567. Following the severe and ascetic character of the Counter-Reformation Pope, who had wanted a functional but not sumptuous construction for his college, Tibaldi interpreted this approach of the client by creating a three-storey building, with a square plan, imposing but not empty scenographic, with internal spaces functional to the community life that takes place there.

In 1586 he went to Spain, where he followed and replaced Federico Zuccari as main court painter. He painted in the lower cloisters of El Escorial at the request of King Philip II. His greatest work were frescoes in the library. After nine years, he returned to Italy and was appointed architect of the Duomo of Milan until his death in Milan in 1592.

Pellegrino's brother, Domenico Pellegrino Tibaldi was an engraver active in Bologna. Among his pupils were Orazio Samacchini, Lorenzo Sabbatini, and Girolamo Miruoli. His son Domenico Tibaldi is known mainly as an architect in Bologna.

Partial anthology of works
Marriage of Saint Catherine –  Pinacoteca, Bologna
St Michael fresco –  Castel Sant'Angelo, Rome
The Adoration of Christ by Shepherds –  Galleria Borghese, Rome
Conception of John the Baptist (1555) –  San Giorgio Maggiore, Bologna
Preaching to the Multitude, (San Giorgio Maggiore, Bologna)
Holy Family and Saint John the Baptist (attributed) –  Indianapolis Museum of Art
Baptism of Christ –  Ancona
  Altarpiece –  Sant'Agostino, Ancona
Incredulity of Thomas (1565) –  drawing, 1565, Ambrosiana, Milan
 The Incredulity of Thomas (recto); Study for the Figure of Thomas (verso) –  drawing, Getty Museum 
The Beheading of St. John the Baptist –  Pinacoteca di Brera, Milan 
Madonna and Child –  Private collection
Holy Family and Holy Elizabeth
Allegory of Silence (1569) –  Museo Civico, Bologna
Blinding of Polyphemus –  Palazzo Sanguinetti
Life of the Virgin –  Escorial, Madrid
Passion of Christ –  Escorial, Madrid
Ecce Homo (1589) –   El Escorial, Madrid
St. Michael –  El Escorial, Madrid
Martyrdom of St. Lawrence –  Escorial, Madrid
 "Story of Joseph" Montreal Museum of Fine Arts, Montreal, Canada

References

The Age of Correggio and the Carracci: Emilian Painting of the 16th and 17th Centuries (exh. cat., Washington, N.G.A.; New York, Met.; Bologna, Pinacoteca; 1986)
Painting in Italy 1500–1600, S. J. Freedberg, (Penguin History of Art, 2nd Edition, 1983). 567–572.
Pellegrino Tibaldi – Catholic Encyclopedia article

External links
 Scholarly articles in English about Pellegrino Tibaldi. Workshop of both in web and PDF @ the Spanish Old Masters Gallery

1527 births
1596 deaths
People from the Province of Como
16th-century Italian architects
Italian Renaissance architects
Architects from Milan
Italian muralists
16th-century Italian painters
Italian male painters
Painters from Milan
Mannerist painters
16th-century Italian sculptors
Italian male sculptors